7000 días juntos, also known as Siete mil días juntos , (English title: Long Life Together) is a 1994 film directed by Fernando Fernán Gómez. It was written by Gómez, Javier García and Maurino Fernando Morales, and stars Pilar Bardem, José Sacristán, Chus Lampreave, María Barranco, Agustín González and Tina Sainz.

References

External links
 

1994 films
1990s Spanish-language films
1994 drama films
Spanish drama films
1990s Spanish films